Gil e Jorge is a 1975 album featuring collaboration between Brazilian musicians Jorge Ben and Gilberto Gil. The two perform together alongside percussionist Djalma Corrêa on each of the songs, improvising and interacting directly throughout. The album was released in Brazil under the title  "Ogum Xangô" (the names of two Yoruba spirits) with a different cover.

Critical reception 

Reviewing the album's CD reissue in 1993, Village Voice critic Robert Christgau wrote:

AllMusic's John Bush believed it was by far the best album in Gil's discography. In 2007, it was listed by Rolling Stone Brazil as one of the 100 best Brazilian albums in history.

Track listing
 "Meu Glorioso São Cristóvão" (Ben) - 8:13
 "Nêga" (Gil) - 10:37
 "Jurubeba" (Gil) - 11:40
 "Quem Mandou (Pé na Estrada)" (Ben) - 6:52
 "Taj Mahal" (Ben) - 14:46
 "Morre o Burro, Fica o Homem" (Ben) - 6:10
 "Essa é pra Tocar no Rádio" (Gil) - 6:14
 "Filhos de Gandhi" (Gil) - 13:11
 "Sarro" (Ben, Gil) - 1:09

Personnel
Jorge Ben - vocals, violão
Gilberto Gil - vocals, violão
Djalma Corrêa - percussion
Wagner Dias - bass

Credits
Art Direction – Jorge Vianna
Design – Aldo Luiz, Rogério Duarte
Mastered By – Joaquim Figueira
Photography – João Castrioto
Producer [Direction] – Paulinho Tapajós, Perinho Albuquerque
Technician [Recording] – Ary, João Moreira, Luigi, Luis Claudio

References

1975 albums
Jorge Ben albums
Gilberto Gil albums
Verve Records albums